Chuck Hiers (born April 21, 1959) is an American professional stock car racing driver. He competes part-time in the ARCA Menards Series, driving the No. 11 Toyota Camry for Fast Track Racing.

Racing career

ARCA Menards Series 
Hiers made his ARCA Menards Series debut in 2003 at Charlotte Motor Speedway. Hiers finished 32nd in his series debut. Hiers returned in 2004 at Daytona International Speedway, finishing 30th. Hiers did not return to the series until 2018 at Daytona, finishing 16th. The following year, he had his best career finish, 14th at Daytona.

Motorsports career results

ARCA Menards Series

ARCA Menards Series East

References

External links 

1959 births
Living people
ARCA Menards Series drivers
NASCAR drivers
Racing drivers from Florida
Racing drivers from Jacksonville, Florida
Sportspeople from Jacksonville, Florida
20th-century American people
21st-century American people